The Glen-Coats Baronetcy, of Ferguslie Park in the Parish of Abbey in the County of Renfrew, was a title in the Baronetage of the United Kingdom. It was created on 25 June 1894 for Thomas Glen-Coats, Director of the thread-making firm of J. & P. Coats, Ltd, and later Liberal Member of Parliament for Renfrewshire West. Born Thomas Coats, he assumed the additional surname of Glen, which was that of his maternal grandfather. He was succeeded by his son, the second Baronet. He won a gold medal in sailing at the 1908 Summer Olympics. The title became extinct on his death in 1954.

Two other members of the Coats family also gained distinction. George Coats, 1st Baron Glentanar, was the younger brother of the first Baronet, while Sir James Coats, 1st Baronet (see Coats baronets), was the first cousin of the first Baronet.

Glen-Coats baronets, of Ferguslie Park (1894)
Sir Thomas Glen Glen-Coats, 1st Baronet (1846–1922)
Sir Thomas Coats Glen Glen-Coats, 2nd Baronet (1878–1954)

See also
Baron Glentanar

References

Extinct baronetcies in the Baronetage of the United Kingdom